Chen Yang (born 26 December 1987) is a Chinese gymnast who represented China at the 2005 Trampoline World Championships.

References

External links
 

1987 births
Living people
Chinese male trampolinists
Medalists at the Trampoline Gymnastics World Championships
21st-century Chinese people